The 1989 Hong Kong Open was a professional ranking snooker tournament, that was held from 7–13 August 1989 at the Hong Kong Convention and Exhibition Centre, Hong Kong.
 
Mike Hallett won the tournament by defeating Dene O'Kane nine frames to eight in the final.


Main draw

References

Australian Goldfields Open
1989 in snooker
1989 in Hong Kong sport